The Buffalo FFillies were a W-League women's soccer club based out of Buffalo, New York. The team began play in 1996 and folded during the 1998 season.

The team name was conceived as an equine homage to the Buffalo Stallions, but two F's were introduced to ward off accusations of sexism and in an attempt to make the name more memorable.

Four Canadian national team players represented the club, including Helen Stoumbos. While Christie Rampone and Pauliina Miettinen signed for the team in 1998. Team owner Mark Fishaut declared before the 1998 season that the club required crowds of 500 in order to survive, but they failed to achieve this and withdrew from the league five games into the campaign.

Year-by-year

References

External links
Official site

Sports in Buffalo, New York
Women's soccer clubs in the United States
Defunct USL W-League (1995–2015) teams
Women's soccer clubs in New York (state)
1996 establishments in New York (state)
1998 disestablishments in New York (state)
Association football clubs established in 1996